LKK may refer to:

Kulik Lake Airport, Alaska, IATA and FAA LID airport code
Lee Kum Kee, a Hong Kong-based food company